Tarsomys is a genus of rodent in the family Muridae found exclusively in Mindanao, Philippines. 
It contains the following species:
 Long-footed rat (Tarsomys apoensis)
 Spiny long-footed rat (Tarsomys echinatus)

References

 
Rodent genera
Taxa named by Edgar Alexander Mearns
Taxonomy articles created by Polbot